Paul Denny (born 24 July 1972) is an Australian stage, television and film actor who played the lead in the international production of Johnno from the novel by David Malouf.

Acting credits

Film

Television

Stage

Awards and nominations

Stage awards

1997 – Won – Matilda Award for Scar
2002 – Won – The Glugs of Gosh Award for Excellence in Theatre
2003 – Won – Matilda Award for The Removalists and A Day in the Death of Joe Egg
2004 – Won – Best Actor – Kaleidoscope Short Film Festival for Top Blokes

Television awards
2009 - Nominated - Best Performance in a Television Comedy - AFI Award for Lowdown

References

External links
Official website

1972 births
Australian male television actors
Australian male film actors
Australian male stage actors
Living people
Male actors from Brisbane
20th-century Australian male actors
21st-century Australian male actors